Forestvale Cemetery (also known as Forest Vale Cemetery) is an historic cemetery in Helena, Montana. It was established in 1890 for the Helena Cemetery Association and laid out by Harry V. Wheeler. The arched stone entrance was built in 1890. Among almost 15,000 gravestones there is a mausoleum, the original property included a house for the sexton. The cemetery has been listed on the National Register of Historic Places since February 21, 1990.

Notable burials include Montana Governors Forrest H. Anderson (1913–1989), Tim Babcock (1919–2015), Sam C. Ford (1882–1961), Samuel T. Hauser (1833–1914), Benjamin F. Potts (1836–1887), and Sam V. Stewart (1872–1939).  Other notables include businessman Charles Arthur Broadwater [1840–1892), painter Ralph E. DeCamp (1858–1936), pioneer James Fergus (1813–1902), Kentucky Governor Preston H. Leslie (1819–1907), actress Myrna Loy (1905–1993), US Senator Wilbur F. Sanders (1834–1905), and rodeo cowgirl Fannie Sperry Steele (1887–1983).

References

External links
 
 

National Register of Historic Places in Helena, Montana
Buildings and structures completed in 1890
Cemeteries on the National Register of Historic Places in Montana